Jonathan Clay is an American singer-songwriter from Magnolia, Texas.

Career
He released his first EP Whole New Me in 2006 on iTunes. Atlantic Records signed Clay to a development deal in 2007. In June 2007 Clay released his second album Back to Good. MTV music supervisors found his work on MySpace. ABC Family used Clay's "After All" in Lincoln Heights in 2008. Levi's and True Anthem sponsored Clay's give away of 140,000 downloads of Acoustic Sessions in 2008. In 2010 Clay recorded Everything She Wants with producer Kevin Kadish. "Gypsy Woman", a cut from that album, was used in the U.S. television series Sons of Anarchy in 2011. In late 2010 Clay formed a new band called Jamestown Revival. The duo teamed Clay with his childhood friend Zach Chance and within six months of forming the band the duo were featured in Rolling Stone magazine for the Cover of the Rolling Stone contest. "Heart on Fire", a song featuring Clay's vocals, was featured in the 2012 comedy LOL starring Miley Cyrus, Demi Moore, Ashley Greene, Adam Sevani, and Douglas Booth. Clay sang three additional songs for the film.

Discography

Albums
2006 Whole New Me
2007 Back to Good
2010 Everything She Wants

Jamestown Revival
 Knives and Pipes (EP, 2011)
 The California EP (EP, 2013)
 Utah. A Collection Of Recorded Moments From The Wasatch Mountains (2014)
 The Education of a Wandering Man (2016)
 Live from Largo at The Coronet Theatre (live album , 2018)
 San Isabel (2019)
 A Field Guide to Loneliness (EP, 2020)
 Fireside with Louis L'Amour. A Collection of Songs Inspired by Tales from the American West (EP, 2021)

Other
2008 Love at War (single!)
2008 This Ones for Me (single and video) *winner MTVu Freshman Video
2009 Acoustic Sessions (EP)
2012 Heart on Fire (Single, from LOL (2012) soundtrack)

References

External links 
 Jonathan Clay at AllMusic
 Official Website
 Jamestown Revival

American country singer-songwriters
American male singer-songwriters
Living people
People from Magnolia, Texas
Country musicians from Texas
Year of birth missing (living people)
Singer-songwriters from Texas